Ronnie Dean Correy (born November 8, 1966 in Bellflower, California) is a former international motorcycle speedway rider from the United States. He was a World Pairs Champion, winning the title in 1992.

Career summary
Correy first rode in the United Kingdom for the Wolverhampton Wolves in 1987, winning the British League championship title in 1991. A year later he won the World Pairs Championship with Greg Hancock and was also a member of the USA team that won the 1992 Speedway World Team Cup.

He scored 4,127 points for Wolverhampton, recording 19 full maxima and 9 paid maxima and scored 366 bonus points with Wolves.

World Final Appearances

Individual World Championship
 1989 -  Munich, Olympic Stadium - 14th - 4pts
 1990 -  Bradford, Odsal Stadium - 14th - 2pts
 1991 -  Göteborg, Ullevi - 10th - 6pts
 1992 -  Wrocław, Olympic Stadium - 12th - 5pts

World Team Cup
 1989 -  Bradford, Odsal Stadium (with Kelly Moran / Greg Hancock / Rick Miller / Lance King) - 4th - 8pts (0)

References

Living people
1966 births
American speedway riders
Belle Vue Aces riders
Edinburgh Monarchs riders
Long Eaton Invaders riders
Wolverhampton Wolves riders